Dark Vengeance is an action video game developed by Reality Bytes and published by GT Interactive for Windows and Macintosh in 1998.

Development
The game was announced in August 1996.

Reception

The game received mixed reviews according to the review aggregation website GameRankings.

References

External links
 

1998 video games
Action video games
GT Interactive games
Macintosh games
Multiplayer and single-player video games
Windows games
Video games developed in the United Kingdom